The Man Who Stayed at Home is a 1915 British silent thriller film directed by Cecil M. Hepworth and starring Dennis Eadie, Violet Hopson and Alma Taylor. It is based on the play by Lechmere Worrall and J. E. Harold Terry.

Plot summary
During the First World War a detective poses as a man who has evaded military service in order to infiltrate a gang of enemy spies operating out of a coastal boarding house.

Cast
 Dennis Eadie as Christopher Brent  
 Violet Hopson as Miriam Leigh 
 Alma Taylor as Molly Preston  
 Lionelle Howard as Carl Sanderson  
 Chrissie White as Daphne Kidlington  
 Henry Edwards as Fritz  
 Dorothy Rowan as Mrs. Sanderson  
 Jean Cadell as Miss Myrtle  
 Ruby Belasco as Fraulein Schroeder

References

Bibliography
 Palmer, Scott. British Film Actors' Credits, 1895-1987. McFarland, 1988.

External links

Play: The Man Who Stayed at Home archive.org Retrieved 15 July 2016

1915 films
1915 drama films
1910s spy thriller films
British thriller drama films
British spy thriller films
British silent feature films
Films directed by Cecil Hepworth
Films set in England
British black-and-white films
1910s thriller drama films
Hepworth Pictures films
1910s English-language films
1910s British films
Silent thriller drama films